Copenhagen disease, sometimes known as Copenhagen syndrome or progressive non-infectious anterior vertebral fusion (PAVF), is a unique spinal disorder with distinctive radiological features. This is a rare childhood disease of unknown cause, affecting females slightly more than males (60%). Prevalence is unknown, but there have been approximately 80–100 individuals with Copenhagen disease reported since 1949. However, there is still little known research due to the rarity of the disease. The disease is so rare that the National Organization for Rare Diseases does not even mention Copenhagen disease in their database.

Copenhagen disease affects the lower back, as can be seen on MRI scans. It is characterized by the progressive fusion of the anterior vertebral body in the thoracolumbar region of the spine.

Presentation 
Individuals with Copenhagen disease are often asymptomatic, but some may present with symptoms including back pain, difficulty walking, and stiffness of the spine, including neck and back, with kyphosis. Kyphosis can progress to angles of up to 85 degrees. Complete bony ankylosis occurs as the disease progresses over the years.

Radiological findings may show anterior deformities in end plates, which is related to narrowing between vertebrae in specific areas. Erosion and irregularity of corresponding end plates is also seen. This is followed by fusion, however fusion is usually not seen in the posterior disc space except in later stages of the disease.

Signs and symptoms

Clinical studies and case reports 
15‐year‐old male

A 15-year-old male presented with major thoracolumbar kyphosis with spinal stiffness. However, there was no presentation of pain, scoliosis, neurologic symptoms, or trouble with ambulating. Through a combination of MRI of the spine, radiography findings, and absence of sacroiliac joint movement, Copenhagen disease was diagnosed. In this individual, exam findings showed anterior vertebral body fusion, as well as multilevel lumbar anterior disc space obliteration and erosion. The narrowing and erosion of end plates can occur in early childhood and progress during adolescence as well. The narrowing can extend posteriorly, leading to complete vertebral fusion. In this 15-year-old male, trans-pedicle osteotomy of T12-L1 was performed in order to treat the individual.

12‐year‐old female

A 12-year-old female presented with progressive thoracolumbar kyphoscoliosis and limiting ability for neck movement. At birth, a split cord malformation was found, but no interventions were done. She was born at full term. Her mother was 27 years-old and her father 32 years-old, both healthy and unrelated to each other. At age 9, she started having problems tilting her spine and bending over as well as moving her head. She was also in pain, specifically in the occipital and suboccipital regions, and had problems walking distances. Throughout childhood, she developed normally, except a slight delay in motor development. At age 12, a physical exam showed her height being considerably below average for her age as well as stiffness in the neck with limited ability for movement, especially flexion. It was also noted a relative ligamentous hyperlaxity in the limbs. She was diagnosed with PAVF which occurred at three vertebral levels including the cervical spine, the cervicothoracic level, and the lumbosacral joint. A CT scan was used to get details of the vertebral malformation which showed fusion of the lateral masses of the axis on the cervical spine with C3, fusion of C7-T5 and T6-T7, and fusion of L5-S1. Additionally, she was also found to have situs inversus visceralis.

8‐year‐old male

A 15-months-old male presented with kyphoscoliosis and stiffness. He had a history of atrial septal defect and pulmonary sequestration that was treated. He was also found to have anterior endplate irregularity. When he was 8 years old, the kyphosis had worsened to severe (85 degrees) and imaging showed that he at this point had multilevel anterior endplate narrowing and anterior endplate edema. Spinal surgery was performed.

12‐year‐old male

A 12-year-old male with a history of progressive thoracolumbar kyphosis was found to have almost complete anterior fusion between two levels at the thoracolumbar junction, T12-L1 and L1-L2. This was determined by the use of radiography and MR imaging. In order to treat his deformity, he had anterior release and spinal instrumentation. Due to other medical problems, treatment was performed late.

9‐year‐old female

A 9-year-old female presented with stiffness of the spine, scoliosis, as well as difference in length of the limbs. She was born with pulmonary stenosis and did several cardiac surgeries at the time. Throughout childhood, she was found to be of short stature. At age 10, MR imaging showed solid fusion at L1/2 and L3/4 and radiography showed enchondromatosis lesions. She also had some family history involving ossification of the posterior longitudinal spinal ligament, however it is not known whether this is related to the female's condition.

Retrospective analysis of 10 individuals with Copenhagen disease

A retrospective study was conducted to better understand the presentation, management, and clinical outcome of individuals treated operatively and non-operatively for Copenhagen disease. The study consisted of 10 individuals with Copenhagen disease; seven individuals were treated non-operatively and three were treated operatively. The study followed up with the individuals in about 14.7 years (mean). Health-related quality of life (HRQOL) was measured through Oswestry Disability Index (ODI), Short Form 12 Health Survey (SF-12), and Visual analogue scale (VAS). Presentation of back pain was common among the individuals. Results showed no significant difference was found when comparing functional scores at time of diagnosis versus last follow-up. In addition, no significant difference was found in functional scores between operative and non-operative treatment groups.

Based on functional outcomes tests in this study, the take-away point is that Copenhagen disease tends to stay stable over time or have small improvements. Operative and non-operative treatments may interrupt worsening of kyphosis to varying degrees. However, it does not correlate with changes in symptoms.

Diagnosis 
Copenhagen disease is more commonly discovered by chance rather than intentionally. MRI scans (favored) and X-rays are used to confirm a diagnosis of PAVF when radiological features are present. MRI is used to visualize the extent of the intervertebral ankylosis. Radiographs collected soon after birth are used for diagnosis, as early detection leads to sooner management.

Thoracolumbar spine X-rays are often used to confirm a diagnosis, and some prominent features include pinching of the anterior intervertebral disc, with fusion eventually going towards the rest of the vertebrae. Sagittal MRI imaging provides accurate scans of the spine showing non-infectious fusion. CT scans can also be used to locate issues in the vertebrae, but this form of diagnosis currently lacks a significant amount of support from the literature. 3D-CT scans can be utilized to clarify the extent of the vertebral malformations, and assist in the differential diagnosis, as multiple congenital spine defects, such as osteogenesis imperfecta, may accompany Copenhagen disease.

Treatment 
Treatment options include spinal bracing, surgical options, and chronic pain management. Kyphosis progression can be halted using a multidisciplinary approach, as the fusion process includes various stages of development. Regular clinical check-ups and close supervision under orthopedic surgeon are crucial to avoid sagittal imbalance. Both lordosis and kyphosis may occur and should be treated accordingly, most often via surgical correction, physical therapy, and anti-inflammatory medications.

Malagelada et al. found that functional scores and symptom presentation did not significantly differ depending on operative or non-operative treatments. However, treatment selection can affect progression of kyphosis. After fusion in the thoracolumbar spine is complete, progression stabilizes into adulthood and symptoms are gradually reduced. There are few case reports of long-term follow-up with longitudinal imaging. There is also limited information on effectiveness and types of bracing, and further data is needed regarding clinician guidelines.

Prognosis 
Prognosis is on the positive side, as Copenhagen disease does not result in serious problems. However, low back pain and junctional thoracolumbar pain is fairly common among individuals with this disease.

Through adolescence and adulthood, the typical anterior fusion of the vertebrae continues to progress until fusion is complete. Although this disease does not lead to major neurological symptoms or pain, individuals living with Copenhagen disease may still have to live with some form of kyphosis. Long-term follow-up is recommended to keep track of progression, but outlook is generally favorable.

History 
Progressive non-infectious anterior vertebral fusion (PAVF), later known as Copenhagen disease, was first fully described by Knutsson in 1949 in a 14-year-old boy. The initial stages of this disease closely resemble that of Scheuermann's disease, where "there is a disturbance in the zone of growth of the vertebral bodies", leading to a wedged-shaped deformation in the spine. However, the deformity in the vertebrae in Copenhagen's disease progresses differently than in Scheuermann's disease. In Copenhagen disease, there is a narrowing of the anterior wall of the intervertebral disc with adjacent end plate erosions. The narrowing progresses until the disc space is eliminated, resulting in bony ankylosis, or stiffness in the joints, and eventually fusion of the anterior vertebral body. In Scheuermann's disease, however, it is very rare for adults to develop ankylosis in their adult life.

The largest series of case reports are from the University Hospital of Copenhagen, which indicate that Copenhagen disease can sometimes be diagnosed from radiographs taken shortly after birth, and the progression of kyphosis tends to progress rapidly during adolescence, rather than in adult life. Although most individuals with Copenhagen disease do not report any other pain or neurological symptoms, spinal bracing has been shown to reduce the kyphosis. In some instances, spinal bracing has shown to reverse kyphosis as well, although there is still limited data and clinical trials on the effectiveness of spinal bracing.

The disease is rare, with most cases found in Europe and very few cases reported in North America.

Terminology 
Copenhagen disease gets its name because the majority of cases were found in University Hospital of Copenhagen.

References

External links 

Musculoskeletal disorders
Ailments of unknown cause
Rare diseases